Juliana Freire de Lima e Silva is a Brazilian computer scientist who works as a professor of computer science and engineering at the New York University. She is known for her research in information visualization, data provenance, and computerized assistance for scientific reproducibility.

Education and career
Freire did her undergraduate studies at the Federal University of Ceará in Brazil, and earned her doctorate from Stony Brook University. Prior to joining NYU-Poly in 2011, she was a researcher at Bell Laboratories, and a faculty member at the Oregon Health & Science University and the University of Utah.

Freire was the program co-chair of the WWW2010 conference.

Research
Freire's research projects include the VisTrails scientific workflow management system, and the DeepPeep search engine for web database content.

Recognition
In 2014, Freire was elected as a Fellow of the Association for Computing Machinery "for contributions to provenance management research and technology, and computational reproducibility."
She was named to the 2021 class of Fellows of the American Association for the Advancement of Science.

References

External links
Home page
Google scholar profile

Year of birth missing (living people)
Living people
American computer scientists
Brazilian computer scientists
Brazilian women computer scientists
Information visualization experts
Stony Brook University alumni
Oregon Health & Science University faculty
University of Utah faculty
New York University faculty
Fellows of the Association for Computing Machinery
Fellows of the American Association for the Advancement of Science
Computer graphics researchers
Scientists at Bell Labs
Federal University of Ceará alumni